Ali Qasim Hameed (born 5 March 1996) is an Iraqi professional footballer who currently plays for Naft Maysan in the Iraqi Premier League.

International debut
On 26 August 2015 Ali Qasim made his first international cap and goal with Iraq against Lebanon in a friendly match.

International statistics

Iraq national team goals 

Scores and results list Iraq's goal tally first.

Honours

International
Iraq U-23
 AFC U-22 Championship: 2013

References

External links
 
 

Iraqi footballers
1996 births
Living people
Iraq international footballers
Al-Mina'a SC players
Al-Talaba SC players
Naft Maysan FC players
People from Maysan Governorate
Association football midfielders